High Efficiency Image File Format (HEIF) is a container format for storing individual digital images and image sequences. The standard covers multimedia files that can also include other media streams, such as timed text, audio and video.

HEIF can store images encoded with multiple coding formats, for example both SDR and HDR images.  HEVC is an image and video encoding format and the default image codec used with HEIF. HEIF files containing HEVC-encoded images are also known as HEIC files. Such files require less storage space than the equivalent quality JPEG.

HEIF files are a special case of the ISO Base Media File Format (ISOBMFF, ISO/IEC 14496-12), first defined in 2001 as a shared part of MP4 and JPEG 2000. Introduced in 2015, it was developed by the Moving Picture Experts Group (MPEG) and is defined as Part 12 within the MPEG-H media suite (ISO/IEC 23008-12).

HEIF was adopted by Apple in 2017 with the introduction of iOS 11.

History 
The requirements and main use cases of HEIF were defined in 2013. 
The technical development of the specification took about one and a half years and was finalized in the middle of 2015.

Apple was the first major adopter of the format in 2017 with the introduction of iOS 11 using HEIC variant.

On some systems, pictures stored in the HEIC format are converted automatically to the older JPEG format when they are sent outside of the system, although incompatibility has led to problems such as US Advanced Placement test takers failing due to their phones uploading unsupported HEIC images by default leading the College Board to request students change the settings to send only JPEG files.

Features 
HEIF files can store the following types of data:

 Image items Storage of individual images, image properties and thumbnails.
 Image derivations Derived images enable non-destructive image editing, and are created on the fly by the rendering software using editing instructions stored separately in the HEIF file. These instructions (rectangular cropping, rotation by one, two or three quarter-turns, timed graphic overlays, etc.) and images are stored separately in the HEIF file, and describe specific transformations to be applied to the input images. The storage overhead of derived images is small.
 Image sequencesStorage of multiple time-related and/or temporally predicted images (like a burst-photo shot or cinemagraph animation), their properties and thumbnails. Different prediction options can be used in order to exploit the temporal and spatial similarities between the images. Hence, file sizes can be drastically reduced when many images are stored in the same HEIF file.
 Auxiliary image items Storage of image data, such as an alpha plane or a depth map, which complements another image item. These data are not displayed as such, but used in various forms to complement another image item.
 Image metadata Storage of EXIF, XMP and similar metadata which accompany the images stored in the HEIF file.

Variants 
As HEIF is a container format, it can contain still images and image sequences that are coded in different formats. 
The main filename extensions are .heif for still images and .heifs for sequences, which can both be used with any codec. Generic HEIF image files are typically stored with filename extensions .heif, but they may use a different extension to indicate the specific codec used.

MIAF 
The Multi-Image Application Format (MIAF) is a restricted subset of HEIF specified as part of MPEG-A. 
It defines a set of additional constraints to simplify format options, specific alpha plane formats, profiles and levels as well as metadata formats and brands, and rules for how to extend the format.

HEIC: HEVC in HEIF 
High Efficiency Video Coding (HEVC, ITU-T H.265) is an encoding format for graphic data, first standardized in 2013.
It is the primarily used and implied default codec for HEIF as specified in the normative Annex B to ISO/IEC 23008-12 HEVC Image File Format.

While not introduced formally in the standard, the acronym HEIC (High-Efficiency Image Container) is used as a brand and in the MIME subtypes image/heic and image/heic-sequence. If the content conforms to certain HEVC profiles, more specific brands can be used: HEIX for Main 10 of HEVC, HEIM for (Multiview) Main profile and HEIS for (Scalable) Main (10) profile of L-HEVC.

A HEIC photo takes up about half the space of an equivalent quality JPEG file. The initial HEIF specification already defined the means of storing HEVC-encoded intra images (i-frames) and HEVC-encoded image sequences in which inter prediction is applied in a constrained manner.

HEVC image players are required to support rectangular cropping and rotation by one, two and three quarter-turns. The primary use case for the mandatory support for rotation by 90 degrees is for images where the camera orientation is incorrectly detected or inferred. The rotation requirement makes it possible to manually adjust the orientation of a still image or an image sequence without needing to re-encode it. Cropping enables the image to be re-framed without re-encoding. The HEVC file format also includes the option to store pre-derived images.

Samples in image sequence tracks must be either intra-coded images or inter-picture predicted images with reference to only intra-coded images. These constraints of inter-picture prediction reduce the decoding latency for accessing any particular image within a HEVC image sequence track.

The .heic and .heics file name extensions are conventionally used for HEVC-coded HEIF files. Apple products, for instance, will only produce files with these extensions, which indicate clearly that the data went through HEVC encoding.

AVCI: AVC in HEIF 

Advanced Video Coding (AVC, ITU-T H.264) is an older encoding format for video and images, first standardized in 2003.
It is also specified as a codec to be supported in HEIF in normative Annex 5 to ISO/IEC 23008-12. 
The registered MIME types are image/avci for still images and image/avcs for sequences. The format is simply known as AVCI.

Apple products support playback of AVC-encoded .avci still image files and .avcs image sequence files but will only generate .heic files.

AVIF: AV1 in HEIF 

AV1 is a video encoding format that is intended to be royalty free developed by the Alliance for Open Media (AOMedia). AV1 Image File Format (AVIF) is an image format based on this codec.

The registered MIME type is image/avif for both still images and image sequences, and .avif is the file name extension.

JPEG compression formats in HEIF files 

The original JPEG standard is the most commonly used and widely supported lossy image coding format, first released in 1992 by ITU-T and ISO/IEC. Although Annex H to ISO/IEC 23008-12 specifies JPEG (and indirectly Motion JPEG) as a possible format for HEIF coded image data, it is used in HEIF only for thumbnails and other secondary images. Therefore, neither a dedicated MIME subtype nor a special file extension is available for storage of JPEG files in HEIF container files.

Several other compression formats defined by the JPEG group can be stored in HEIF files:
Part 16 of the JPEG 2000 standard suite (ISO/IEC 15444-16 and ITU-T Rec. T.815) defines how to store JPEG 2000 images in HEIF container files. Part 2 of the JPEG 2000 suite (ISO/IEC 15444-2 and ITU-T Rec. T.801) also defines a different format for storing JPEG 2000 images in files that is also based on ISOBMFF.
Annex F of the JPEG XR image coding standard (ISO/IEC 29199-2 and ITU-T Rec. T.832) defines how to store JPEG XR images in HEIF container files. Annex A of JPEG XR also defines a different file format for storing JPEG XR images in files that is TIFF-based, and Part 2 of the JPEG 2000 suite (ISO/IEC 15444-2 and ITU-T Rec. T.801) also supports a third file format for storing JPEG XR images in files that is based on ISOBMFF.
JPEG XS has its HEIF container support defined in ISO/IEC 21122-3.

In 2017, Apple announced that it would adopt HEIC as the default image format in its new operating systems, gradually replacing JPEG.

Both AVIF and HEIC are currently being considered as possible replacements for the universal JPEG format because, among other technical contributions, both can reduce file size by about 50% while maintaining equivalent quality.

WXAM, SharpP 

The proprietary image format WXAM or wxHEPC developed by Tencent and used e.g. within WeChat is apparently based upon HEVC, as is SharpP, also known as TPG (Tiny Portable Graphics), which was developed by their SNG division. 
However, their container format may not be HEIF-compatible. TPG may also use AVS2.

Support 

Nokia provides an open source Java HEIF decoder.
 The open source library "libheif" supports reading and writing HEIF files. From version 1.8.0, both reading and writing HEIC and AVIF are supported.
 A free image codec called CopyTrans HEIC, available for Windows versions 7 through 10, supports opening HEIF files in Windows Photo Viewer without the Microsoft codec installed. (The Microsoft HEIC codec is only available for Windows 10, version 1803 and up in the Photos UWP app.)

Operating systems 

 Windows 10 version 1803 and later (HEIC), version 1903 and later (AVIF): HEIF Image Extension is needed to read and write files that use the HEIF format.  HEVC Video Extensions is needed to play and produce HEVC-encoded video content.  A small amount of money is charged for the use of the HEVC codec, whereas support for the generic HEIF format and the AVC and AV1 extensions are free.
 macOS High Sierra and later (HEIC only) Since macOS Mojave, Apple uses HEIF in creating the Dynamic Desktop feature.
 iOS 11 and later (HEIC only) iOS 16 and later AVIF
Apple supports playback of .heif for still image files and .heifs for image sequence files created on other devices that are encoded using any codec, provided that codec is supported by the operating system.
 Android 8 (Oreo) and later (HEIF), Android 10 and later (HEIC), Android 12 and later (AVIF)
 Ubuntu 20.04 and later (HEIC)

Web browsers 

, no browser supports HEIC format natively.

For AVIF, Chrome, Firefox and Opera for desktop and Android support it. Safari on iOS 16 and iPadOS 16 supports AVIF format.

Image editing software 

 Adobe Lightroom (macOS 10.13+, iOS 11+, Windows 10+, and Android 9+)
Adobe Photoshop 
(Note that Photoshop for Windows requires the installation of both the HEIF and HEVC CODECs available from Microsoft.)
Photoshop reads HEIC files, but as of 2022 does not allow saving to that format.
 Affinity Photo
 GIMP recognizes and treats HEIF files since version 2.10.2, released in May 2018.
 Darktable
 GraphicConverter
 ImageMagick
 Krita
 Paint.net
 PaintShop Pro
 Pixelmator (version 3.7 and above)
 Zoner Photo Studio X

Hardware 
 The Canon EOS-1D X Mark III, Canon EOS R5, and Canon EOS R6 cameras use the HEIF format to capture images in an HDR display format that use the PQ tone curve, BT.2100 color primaries and 10-bit. "We've moved on to HEIF files," Canon said in 2019.
 The Sony α1 and Sony α7 IV offer capturing images in 10-bit HEIF format with an HDR format that uses HLG.
 The Fujifilm X-H2S offers a choice of JPEG or 10-bit HEIF file formats.
 Multiple Qualcomm Snapdragon SoCs support capturing images in HEIC format (e.g. Snapdragon 888, Snapdragon 662). Some of their latest SoCs also support capturing in HEIC with HDR (e.g. Snapdragon 8 Gen 1, Snapdragon 780).
 The iPhone 7 and later devices from Apple can capture media in HEIF or HEVC format.
 Android smartphones like Xiaomi 12, OPPO Reno 7 5G, Samsung Galaxy S21 5G can capture images in HEIF format.

Websites 
 During May 2020, online Advanced Placement exams allowed students to submit photos of handwritten responses. Because the website was unable to process HEIF images, students whose phones defaulted to this image format were considered to have not submitted any response and often failed to complete the exam. College Board, which administers the exams, later provided a system for users to submit photos of answers via e-mail. Because the iOS Mail app automatically converts HEIF images to JPEG, this mitigated the problem.
 Facebook supports the upload of HEIC but converts to JPEG or WEBP on display.
 Discord does not support HEIC at all.

Patent licensing 

HEIF itself is a container that may not be subject to additional royalty fees for commercial ISOBMFF licensees. Note however that Nokia also grants its patents on a royalty-free basis for non-commercial purposes. When containing images and image sequences encoded in a particular format (e.g. HEVC or AVC) its use becomes subject to the licensing of patents on the coding format.

See also 
 Better Portable Graphics (BPG) – another image file format using HEVC encoding, published by Fabrice Bellard in 2014
 Free Lossless Image Format (FLIF) – FOSS image format released in 2015, claiming to outperform PNG, WebP, BPG and JPEG 2000 for lossless encoding at least
 WebP – an image file format based on the VP8 and VP9 video formats

References

External links 
 
 HEIF – MPEG Image File Format standard site
 HEIF – format site at Nokia with source code at GitHub
 libheif – source code at GitHub

Animated graphics file formats
Computer-related introductions in 2015
Graphics standards
Image compression
MPEG-H
High dynamic range file formats